Basket Lattes Montpellier Agglomération (BLMA) is a French women's basketball club from Lattes, Montpellier Agglomération. Founded in 1974 as Basket Lattes-Maurin Montpellier, it took its current name in 2002.

Lattes won the 2011 national cup and was the national championship's runner-up in 2008. It has played the Euroleague in 2009 and 2012, in addition to three Eurocup appearances.

Titles
Ligue Féminine de Basketball
Champions (2): 2013–14, 2015–16
Coupe de France
Champions (4): 2011, 2013, 2015, 2016

Roster

Current roster

2011-12 Roster

 (1.92)  Sandra Dijon
 (1.90)  Kaayla Chones
 (1.89)  Diandra Tchatchouang
 (1.88)  Mathilde Roche
 (1.86)  Kristen Mann
 (1.85)  Justine Barthelemy
 (1.85)  Fatimatou Sacko
 (1.82)  Ana Lelas
 (1.78)  Virginie Brémont
 (1.77)  Gaelle Skrela
 (1.68)  Léa Batrie
 (1.66)  Edwige Lawson

References

Women's basketball teams in France
Basketball teams established in 1974
Sport in Montpellier